Hesudra divisa is a moth in the family Erebidae. It is found in the Himalaya, Taiwan and Borneo.

The wingspan is 33–53 mm. Adults are on wing in March and May.

References

Moths described in 1878
Lithosiina